Richard Nagy (born 10 August 2000) is a Slovak footballer who plays for 1. FC Tatran Prešov as a defender, on loan from MŠK Žilina.

Club career

MFK Tatran Liptovský Mikuláš
Nagy made his Fortuna Liga debut for Liptovský Mikuláš against Zlaté Moravce on 12 February 2022.

References

External links
 MFK Tatran Liptovský Mikuláš official club profile
 Fortuna Liga profile
 
 Futbalnet profile

2000 births
Living people
Footballers from Bratislava
Slovak footballers
Association football defenders
MŠK Žilina players
MFK Tatran Liptovský Mikuláš players
1. FC Tatran Prešov players
2. Liga (Slovakia) players
Slovak Super Liga players